Ledden is a surname. Notable people with the surname include:

Emma Ledden (born 1977), Irish author, television presenter, model, and writer
James Ledden (died 1927), Irish politician
Peter Ledden (born 1943), English cricketer

See also
Leden